Jesús Vázquez Alcalde (born 2 January 2003) is a Spanish professional footballer who plays as a left back for La Liga club Valencia.

Club career
Born in Mérida, Badajoz, Extremadura, Vázquez joined Valencia CF's youth setup at the age of five. He made his senior debut with the reserves on 1 November 2020, starting in a 0–0 Segunda División B home draw against Hércules CF.

Vázquez made his first team debut on 16 December 2020, starting in a 4–2 away win against Terrassa FC for the season's Copa del Rey. He scored his first senior goal the following 21 March, netting the B's only goal in a 1–2 loss at CD Alcoyano.

On 1 June 2021, Vázquez renewed his contract until 2025. He made his La Liga debut on 28 August, coming on as a late substitute for Denis Cheryshev in a 3–0 home win over Deportivo Alavés.

Personal life
Vázquez's father Braulio was also a footballer. A forward, he played as a professional for Deportivo de La Coruña, S.C. Farense and CP Mérida.

Career statistics

Club

References

External links
Profile at the Valencia CF website

2003 births
Living people
People from Mérida, Spain
Sportspeople from the Province of Badajoz
Spanish footballers
Footballers from Extremadura
Association football defenders
La Liga players
Segunda División B players
Tercera Federación players
Valencia CF Mestalla footballers
Valencia CF players
Spain youth international footballers